WDDJ (96.9 FM) is a radio station licensed to serve Paducah, Kentucky, United States.  The station is owned by Bristol Broadcasting Company along with "twin stations" "Electric 94.9" in Tri-Cities, Tennessee/Virginia, and "Electric 102.7" in Charleston, West Virginia. WDDJ broadcasts a Top 40 (CHR) music format.

History
The station was assigned the call sign WPAD-FM on October 18, 1978.  On March 1, 1980, the station changed its call sign to the current WDDJ.

Current line-up
As of June 2018 the on-air line-up for Electric 96.9 is as follows:

Weekdays
The Electric Morning Show AJ & Courtney 6a-10a
Mark Summer 10a-3p
Carl P 3p-7p
 7p-Midnight

Weekends
There is a rotating live air staff on hand from 10a-6p.
Syndicated weekend programming includes; Open House Party, Sonrise with Kevin Peterson, and Dawson McAllister Live

References

External links

DDJ
Contemporary hit radio stations in the United States